Joe Kelly may refer to:

Entertainment
Joe Kelly (parenting writer) (born 1954), co-founder of the U.S. advocacy non-profit Dads and Daughters
Joe Kelly (comics writer) (born 1971), comic book and animation writer
Joe Kelly (General Hospital), fictional character on the ABC soap opera General Hospital

Sports

Baseball
Joe Kelly (1910s outfielder) (1886–1977), outfielder in Major League Baseball, played for the Chicago Cubs, Pittsburgh Pirates, and Boston Braves
Joe Kelly (1920s outfielder) (1900–1967), outfielder in Major League Baseball, played for the Chicago Cubs
Joe Kelly (pitcher) (born 1988), pitcher in Major League Baseball for the St. Louis Cardinals, Boston Red Sox, Los Angeles Dodgers, and Chicago White Sox

Football
Joe Kelly (American football) (born 1964), former NFL linebacker
Joe Kelly (Canadian football) (born 1937), Canadian football player
Joe Kelly (footballer, born 1884) (1884–1961), Australian rules footballer for Geelong
Joe Kelly (footballer, born 1907) (1907–1998), Australian rules footballer for Carlton, and coach of Footscray and South Melbourne

Other sports
Joe Kelly (boxer) (born 1964), British bantamweight boxer
Joe Kelly (racing driver) (1913–1993), Formula One driver
Joe Kelly (hurler) (1923–1994), retired Irish hurler

Other fields 
Joe W. Kelly (1910–1979), U.S. Air Force general
Joe Kelly (New South Wales politician) (1905–1995), Australian politician
Joe Kelly (Queensland politician) (born 1970), Australian politician
Joe Kelly (attorney) (born 1956), Nebraska Lieutenant Governor

See also 
Joe Kelley (1871–1943), American left fielder for the Baltimore Orioles 
Joseph Kelly (disambiguation)